The House at 509 North Avenue in Wakefield, Massachusetts is a small Greek Revival cottage.  The single story wood-frame house was built c. 1848 and moved to its present location c. 1869.  The house is three bays wide and one deep, and exhibits very simple Greek Revival styling, including a boxed cornice and simple door and window surrounds.  This house was probably built on land subdivided from holdings of ice companies working on nearby Lake Quannapowitt.  Its earliest documented resident was listed in the town's 1869 directory as a shoemaker.

The house was listed on the National Register of Historic Places in 1989.

See also
National Register of Historic Places listings in Wakefield, Massachusetts
National Register of Historic Places listings in Middlesex County, Massachusetts

References

Houses in Wakefield, Massachusetts
Houses on the National Register of Historic Places in Wakefield, Massachusetts
Italianate architecture in Massachusetts
Houses completed in 1848
Greek Revival architecture in Massachusetts